Jerald Daemyon is an American electric violinist born in Detroit, Michigan. Daemyon rose to fame in 1995 with his debut album Thinking About You.

References

External links

American jazz violinists
American male violinists
Living people
Musicians from Detroit
Year of birth missing (living people)
Marygrove College alumni
University of Michigan people
Jazz musicians from Michigan
21st-century American violinists
21st-century American male musicians
American male jazz musicians